Secondigliano is an old Italian municipality which became a modern suburb in the north of Naples.

Geography
Secondigliano lies between San Pietro a Patierno and Scampìa.

History
The name may derive from a contraction of "secondo" (second) and "miglio" (mile) since the area was at the second milestone on the ancient road to Capua. Alternatively, the name may derive from the Roman family name "Secondili." The area was a feudal holding in the Middle Ages and was not part of the city of Naples until the Fascist period.

Secondigliano is relatively modern, the result of extensive building in the 1970s and 1980s, as a result of Law 167 (1962) and by the public housing institute IACP -Istituto Autonomo Case Popolari, (Law 865, 1971).  The area has been the focus of studies and analysis because of the initial difficulties of settlement of a part of the settled population moved from the historic city

The area has enormous social problems similar to those in adjacent communities: high unemployment, a truancy and drop-out rate from school, drugs and pervasive organized crime group, the Camorra. Secondigliano is the site of one of the most important maximum security prisons in Italy. The prison appeared in the 2012 documentary feature The Triplet.

Very well known was the Secondigliano tragedy, on 23 January 1996, when 11 people died.

See also
Secondigliano Alliance
Scissionisti di Secondigliano

Notes and references

External links
 Story of Secondigliano

Quartieri of Naples
Former municipalities of the Province of Naples
History of the Camorra in Italy
Secondigliano Alliance